Leyla Huseynagha qizi Mammadbeyova (May 12, 1922 – May 23, 2006) was an Azerbaijani and Soviet scientist, pathologist, professor and honored scientist of Azerbaijan SSR. She was the first female professor in Azerbaijan in the field of pathology, the first female forensic medical expert, and the first female chief pathologist of Azerbaijan.

Leyla Mammadbeyova studied under professor Ivan Shirokogorov. For more than 40 years she served as a director of the pathological laboratory at the Research Institute for Clinical and Experimental Medicine.

Mammadbeyova published more than 200 scientific publications, and was awarded several orders and medals.

See also
Mammadbeyov, noble family of Azerbaijan

References

1922 births
2006 deaths
People from Quba
Azerbaijani nobility
Azerbaijani women scientists
Azerbaijani pathologists
Azerbaijani people of Georgian descent
Soviet pathologists
Soviet women physicians